Faisal Darisi (born 11 February 1997) is a Saudi Arabian professional footballer who plays for Najran as a centre-back.

Darisi is an academy graduate of Al-Ahli. He made his debut for the first team in the King Cup quarter-final match against Al-Fayha. On 31 July 2018, Darisi signed a three-year professional contract with Al-Ahli. He made his league debut for Al-Ahli on 28 March 2019, in the eventual 5–4 loss against Al-Raed. On 10 July 2019, Darisi joined Al-Raed on loan until the end of the 2019–20 season.

References

External links
 

1997 births
Living people
Saudi Arabian footballers
Association football defenders
Saudi Professional League players
Saudi First Division League players
Al-Ahli Saudi FC players
Al-Raed FC players
Najran SC players
Saudi Arabia youth international footballers